Autonomous sensory meridian response (ASMR) is a tingling sensation that usually  begins on the scalp and moves down the back of the neck and upper spine. A pleasant form of paresthesia, it has been compared with auditory-tactile synesthesia and may overlap with frisson.

ASMR is a subjective experience of "low-grade euphoria" characterized by "a combination of positive feelings and a distinct static-like tingling sensation on the skin." It is most commonly triggered by specific auditory or visual stimuli, and less commonly by intentional attention control. A genre of videos intended to induce ASMR has emerged, approximately 25 million of which had been published on YouTube by 2022 and a dedicated category of live ASMR streams on Twitch.

Etymology
Although many colloquial and formal terms used and proposed between 2007 and 2010 included reference to orgasm, a significant majority objected to its use among those active in online discussions. Many differentiate between the euphoric, relaxing nature of ASMR and sexual arousal. However, the argument for sexual arousal persists, and some proponents have published videos categorized as ASMRotica (ASMR erotica), which are deliberately designed to be sexually stimulating.

Early proponents of ASMR concluded that the phenomenon was generally unrelated to sexual arousal. In 2010, Jennifer Allen, a participant in an online forum, proposed that the phenomenon be named "autonomous sensory meridian response". Allen chose the words intending or assuming them to have the following specific meanings:
 Autonomous – spontaneous, self-governing, with or without control
 Sensory – about the senses or sensation
 Meridian – signifying a peak, climax, or point of highest development
 Response – referring to an experience triggered by something external or internal
Allen verified in a 2016 interview that she purposely selected these terms because they were more objective, comfortable, and clinical than alternative terms for the sensation. In that interview, Allen explained she selected the word meridian to replace the word orgasm and said she had found a dictionary that defined meridian as "a point or period of highest development, greatest prosperity, or the like".

Sensation

The subjective experience, sensation, and perceptual phenomenon of ASMR is described by some of those susceptible to it as "akin to a mild electrical current...or the carbonated bubbles in a glass of champagne". The tingling sensation on the skin in general, called paresthesia, is referred to by ASMR enthusiasts as "tingles" when experienced along the scalp, neck, and back. It has been described as "a static tingling sensation originating from the back of the head, then propagating to the neck, shoulder, arm, spine, and legs, which makes people feel relaxed and alert".

Variance 
Though little scientific research has been conducted into potential neurobiological correlates to the perceptual phenomenon, with a consequent dearth of data with which to explain its physical nature, personal commentary from forums, blogs, and video comments have been analyzed to describe the phenomenon. Analysis of this anecdotal evidence has supported the original consensus that ASMR is euphoric but non-sexual, and has divided those who experience ASMR into two broad categories of subjects. One category depends upon external triggers to experience the localized sensation and its associated feelings, which typically originates in the head, often reaching down the neck and sometimes the upper back. The other category can intentionally augment the sensation and feelings through attentional control, without dependence upon external stimuli, or 'triggers', in a manner compared by some subjects to their experience of meditation.

Triggers
ASMR is usually precipitated by stimuli referred to as 'triggers'. ASMR triggers, which are most commonly auditory and visual, may be encountered through the interpersonal interactions of daily life. Additionally, ASMR is often triggered by exposure to specific audio and video. Such media may be specially made with the specific purpose of triggering ASMR or created for other purposes and later discovered to be effective as a trigger of the experience.

Stimuli that can trigger ASMR, as reported by those who experience it, include the following:
 Listening to a softly spoken or whispering voice
 Listening to quiet, repetitive sounds resulting from someone engaging in a mundane task such as turning the pages of a book
 Watching somebody attentively execute a mundane task such as preparing food
 Receiving personal attention, e.g. grooming (makeup application, hair brushing)
 Initiating the stimulus through conscious manipulation without the need for external video or audio triggers
 Listening to tapping, typically nails onto surfaces such as plastic, wood, paper, metal, etc.
 Hand movements, especially onto one's face
 Listening to certain types of music
 Listening to a person blow or exhale into a microphone
 Listening to "crinkly" items such as paper, clothes, and substances such as styrofoam
 Listening to mouth sounds, e.g. quiet clicking of the tongue or the mouth sound "tsk"
 Listening to keyboard typing
 Listening to the sound of footsteps

A 2017 study of 130 survey respondents found that lower-pitched, complex sounds, and slow-paced, detail-focused videos are especially effective triggers.

Auditory
The effect reportedly can be triggered by whispering.

Many of those who experience ASMR report that non-vocal ambient noises performed through human activities are also effective triggers of ASMR. Examples of such noises include fingers scratching or tapping a surface, brushing hair, hands rubbing together or manipulating fabric, the crushing of eggshells, the crinkling and crumpling of a flexible material such as paper, or writing. Many YouTube videos that are intended to trigger ASMR responses feature a single person performing these actions and the sounds that result.

Personal attention
In addition to the effectiveness of specific auditory stimuli, many subjects report that ASMR is triggered by the receipt of tender personal attention, often comprising combined physical touch and vocal expression, such as when having their hair cut, nails painted, ears cleaned, or back massaged, while the service provider speaks quietly to the recipient.

Furthermore, many of those who have experienced ASMR during these and other comparable encounters with a service provider report that watching an "ASMRtist" simulate the provision of such personal attention, acting directly to the camera as if the viewer were the recipient of a simulated service, is sufficient to trigger it.

Clinical
Among the category of intentional ASMR videos that simulate the provision of personal attention is a subcategory wherein the "ASMRtist" is specifically depicted providing clinical or medical services, including routine general medical examinations. The creators of these videos make no claims to the reality of what is depicted, and the viewer is intended to be aware that they are watching and listening to a simulation, performed by an artist. Nonetheless, many viewers attribute therapeutic outcomes to these and other categories of intentional ASMR videos, and there are voluminous anecdotal reports of their effectiveness in inducing sleep for those susceptible to insomnia, and assuaging a range of symptoms, including those associated with depression, anxiety and panic attacks.

Tactile
In addition to audio and visual stimuli, ASMR may be caused by light touches and brushing against the skin such as effleurage.

Background and history

Contemporary
The contemporary history of ASMR began on 19 October 2007 on a discussion forum for health-related subjects at a website called Steady Health. A 21-year-old registered user with the handle "okaywhatever" submitted a post describing having experienced a specific sensation since childhood, comparable to that stimulated by tracing fingers along the skin, yet often triggered by seemingly random and unrelated non-haptic events, such as "watching a puppet show" or "being read a story".

Replies to this post indicated that a significant number of other people had experienced the sensation which "okaywhatever" described – also in response to witnessing mundane events. The interchanges precipitated the formation of a number of web-based locations intended to facilitate further discussion and analysis of the phenomenon for which there were plentiful anecdotal accounts, yet no consensus-agreed name nor any scientific data or explanation.

Earlier

Austrian writer Clemens J. Setz suggests that a passage from the novel Mrs Dalloway authored by Virginia Woolf and published in 1925, describes something distinctly comparable. In the passage from Mrs Dalloway cited by Setz, a nursemaid speaks to the man who is her patient "deeply, softly, like a mellow organ, but with a roughness in her voice like a grasshopper's, which rasped his spine deliciously and sent running up into his brain waves of sound".

According to Setz, this citation generally alludes to the effectiveness of the human voice and soft or whispered vocal sounds specifically as a trigger of ASMR for many of those who experience it, as demonstrated by the responsive comments posted to YouTube videos that depict someone speaking softly or whispering, typically directly to the camera.

Evolutionary

There are no known sources for any evolutionary origins for ASMR since it has yet to be identified as having biological correlations. Even so, a significant majority of descriptions of ASMR by those who experience it compare the sensation to that precipitated by receipt of tender physical touch, providing examples such as having their hair cut or combed. This has led to the conjecture that ASMR might be related to the act of grooming.

For example, David Huron, Professor in the School of Music at Ohio State University, states:

Imaging subjects' brains with fMRI as they reported experiencing ASMR tingles suggests support for this hypothesis, because brain areas such as the medial prefrontal cortex (associated with social behaviors including grooming), and the secondary somatosensory cortex (associated with the sensation of touch) were activated more strongly during tingle periods than control periods.

Media

Videos

The most popular source of stimuli reported by subjects to be effective in triggering ASMR is video. Videos reported being effective in triggering ASMR generally fall into two categories: "Intentional"' and "Unintentional". Intentional media is created by those known as "ASMRtists" to trigger ASMR in viewers and listeners. Unintentional media is that made for other reasons, often before attention was drawn to the phenomenon in 2007, but which some subjects discover to be effective in triggering ASMR. Examples of unintentional media include British author John Butler and American painter Bob Ross. In Ross's episodes of his television series The Joy of Painting both broadcast and on YouTube, his soft, gentle speaking mannerisms and the sound of his painting and his tools trigger the effect in some viewers.  The work of stop-motion filmmaker PES is also often noted.

Binaural recording

Some ASMR video creators use binaural recording techniques to simulate the acoustics of a three-dimensional environment, reported to elicit in viewers and listeners the experience of being in proximity to actor and vocalist. Binaural recordings are usually made using two microphones, just like stereo recordings. However, in binaural recordings, the two microphones tend to be more specially designed to mimic ears on humans. In many cases, microphones are separated the same distance as ears are on humans, and microphones are surrounded by ear-shaped cups to get similar reverb as human ears.

Viewing and hearing such ASMR videos that comprise ambient sound captured through binaural recording has been compared to the reported effect of listening to binaural beats, which are also alleged to precipitate pleasurable sensations and the subjective experience of calm and equanimity.
Binaural recordings are made specifically to be heard through headphones rather than loudspeakers. When listening to sound through loudspeakers, the left and right ear can both hear the sound coming from both speakers. In contrast, when listening to sound through headphones, the sound from the left earpiece is audible only to the left ear, and the sound from the right earpiece is audible only to the right ear. In producing binaural media, the sound source is recorded by two separate microphones, placed at a distance comparable to that between two ears, and they are not mixed, but remain separate on the final medium, whether video or audio.

Listening to a binaural recording through headphones simulates the binaural hearing by which people listen to live sounds. For the listener, this experience is characterized by two perceptions. Firstly, the listener perceives themself as being near the performers and location of the sound source. Secondly, the listener perceives what is often reported as a three-dimensional sound. This means the listener can perceive both the position and distance of the source of sound relative to the microphones, making it seem as if they are in place of the microphones.

Reception

On 12 March 2012, Steven Novella, Director of General Neurology at the Yale School of Medicine, published a post about ASMR on his blog Neurologica. Regarding the question of whether ASMR is a real phenomenon, Novella said "In this case, I don't think there is a definitive answer, but I am inclined to believe that it is. Several people seem to have independently experienced and described" it with "fairly specific details. In this way it's similar to migraine headaches – we know they exist as a syndrome primarily because many different people report the same constellation of symptoms and natural history". Novella tentatively posited the possibilities that ASMR might be either a type of pleasurable seizure or another way to activate the "pleasure response". However, Novella drew attention to the lack of scientific investigation into ASMR, suggesting that functional magnetic resonance imaging (fMRI) and transcranial magnetic stimulation technologies should be used to study the brains of people who experience ASMR in comparison to people who do not, as a way of beginning to seek scientific understanding and explanation of the phenomenon.

Four months after Novella's blog post, Tom Stafford, a lecturer in psychology and cognitive sciences at the University of Sheffield, was reported to have said that ASMR "might well be a real thing, but it's inherently difficult to research... something like this that you can't see or feel" and "doesn't happen for everyone". Stafford compared the current status of ASMR with the development of attitudes toward synesthesia, which he said "for years... was a myth, then in the 1990s people came up with a reliable way of measuring it".

Comparisons and associations with other phenomena

Synesthesia

Integral to the subjective experience of ASMR is a localized tingling sensation that many describe as similar to being gently touched, but which is stimulated by watching and listening to video media in the absence of any physical contact with another person.

These reports have precipitated comparison between ASMR and synesthesia – a condition characterized by the excitation of one sensory modality by stimuli that normally exclusively stimulates another, as when the hearing of a specific sound induces the visualization of a distinct color, shape, or object, a type of synesthesia called chromesthesia. Thereby, people with other types of synesthesia report, for example, "seeing sounds" in the case of auditory-visual synesthesia, or "tasting words" in the case of lexical-gustatory synesthesia.

In the case of ASMR, many report the perception of "being touched" by the sights and sounds presented on a video recording, comparable to visual-tactile and auditory-tactile synesthesia.

Misophonia

Some people have sought to relate ASMR to misophonia, which means the 'hatred of sound', but manifests typically as "automatic negative emotional reactions to particular sounds – the opposite of what can be observed in reactions to specific audio stimuli in ASMR".

For example, those who have  misophonia often report that specific human sounds, including those made by eating, breathing, whispering, or repetitive tapping noises, can precipitate feelings of anger and disgust, in the absence of any previously learned associations that might otherwise explain those reactions.

There are plentiful anecdotal reports by those who claim to have both misophonia and ASMR at multiple web-based user-interaction and discussion locations. Common to these reports is the experience of ASMR to some sounds, and misophonia in response to others.

Frisson

The tingling sensation that characterizes ASMR has been compared and contrasted to frisson.

The French word frisson signifies a brief sensation usually reported as pleasurable and often expressed as an overwhelming emotional response to stimuli, such as a piece of music. Frisson often occurs simultaneously with piloerection, colloquially known as "goosebumps", by which tiny muscles called arrector pili contract, causing body hair, particularly that on the limbs and back of the neck, to erect or "stand on end".

Although ASMR and frisson are "interrelated in that they appear to arise through similar physiological mechanisms", individuals who have experienced both describe them as qualitatively different, with different kinds of triggers. A 2018 fMRI study showed that the major brain regions already known to be activated in frisson are also activated in ASMR, and suggests that "the similar pattern of activation of both ASMR and frisson could explain their subjective similarities, such as their short duration and tingling sensation".

Sexuality
People who experience ASMR report feeling relaxed and sleepy after watching and listening to ASMR content. While some journalists and commentators have portrayed ASMR as intimate, they go on to say there is no evidence of any connection between ASMR and sexual arousal. Nevertheless, performance studies scholar Emma Leigh Waldron has noted that the links between ASMR and sexual arousal are perhaps due to the way that ASMR can engage viewers/listeners in ambiguous relations to what she calls "mediated intimacy". Waldron says that while sex itself is very narrowly defined to specific actions and bodies, that the moral panic emerging from these videos is demonstrative of their inherent queerness, ultimately calling into question the meaning of simulated intimacy and categorically non-sexual pleasure for diverse consumers of ASMR content.

In popular culture

Contemporary art
Berlin-based artist Claire Tolan is a contemporary artist working with ASMR, having produced works for the CTM Festival, collaborated with noted composer Holly Herndon, and exhibited widely in North America and Europe. She has been working consistently in this genre since 2013.

British artist Lucy Clout's single channel video 'Shrugging Offing', made for exhibition in March 2013, uses the model of online ASMR broadcasts as the basis for a work exploring the female body.

Digital arts
The first digital arts installation specifically inspired by ASMR was by the American artist Julie Weitz and called Touch Museum, which opened at the Young Projects Gallery on 13 February 2015 and comprised video screenings distributed throughout seven rooms.

Music
The music for Julie Weitz' Touch Museums digital art installation was composed by Benjamin Wynn under his pseudonym 'Deru' and was the first musical composition specifically created for live ASMR arts event.

Subsequently, artists Sophie Mallett and Marie Toseland created 'a live binaural sound work' composed of ASMR triggers, broadcast by Resonance FM, the listings for which advised the audience to "listen with headphones for the full sensory effect".

On 18 May 2015, contemporary composer Holly Herndon released an album called Platform which included a collaboration with artist Claire Tolan named "Lonely At The Top", intended to trigger ASMR.

The track "Brush" from Holly Pester's 2016 album and poetry collection Common Rest featured artist Claire Tolan, exploring ASMR and its relation to lullaby.

Film
The hair-cutting scene of the film Battle of the Sexes deliberately included several ASMR triggers. Director Jonathan Dayton stated "People work to make videos that elicit this response ... and we were wondering, 'Could we get that response in a theater full of people?'"

There have been three successfully crowdfunded projects, each based on proposals to make a film about ASMR: two documentaries and one fictional piece. None of these films have been completed. A short documentary about ASMR, Tertiary Sound, was selected to be screened at BFI London Film Festival in 2019. A scene featuring an ASMR content creator, Slight Sounds, was featured in the coming of age horror movie We're All Going to the World's Fair. 

The first feature film drama that focuses on ASMR is the New Zealand psychological drama, Shut Eye,which looks at the relationship between an insomniac and a popular ASMR creator. The film premiered at the 2022 New Zealand International Film Festival.

Television
On 31 July 2015, the BBC panel show Would I Lie To You? featured an ASMR content maker as a guest as part of the "This is my" round, which resulted in the reveal of the person connected to comedian Joe Lycett.

In 2018, ASMR, along with a number of its adherents, was featured on Netflix's show Follow This for an episode titled "The Internet Whisperers".

During Super Bowl LIII in 2019, Anheuser-Busch broadcast an ASMR-themed commercial for its Michelob Ultra Pure Gold beer, where Zoë Kravitz uses ASMR techniques including whispering and tapping on a Pure Gold bottle into two microphones. Rolling Stone described the commercial as an example of ASMR " mainstream".

On 3 May 2019 episode of HBO's Real Time with Bill Maher, the host Bill Maher and the musician Moby discussed and demonstrated their use of ASMR as a coping mechanism.

On 16 May 2019 episode of the CBS All Access series The Good Fight, titled "The One About the End of the World", a law firm uses ASMR-style presentations to try to get through to a judge when they discover he is an avid follower of the phenomenon.

In an episode of Criminal Minds (season 14 episode 12 entitled "Hamelin"), the BAU team hunts for an unknown suspect who uses ASMR to (almost) hypnotize children to leave their homes in the middle of the night to come to meet up and voluntarily get into his van. Dr. Spencer Reid is sent a video from the unknown suspect of him making the auditory recording that he then plays from his van outside each child's house to lure them out.

In episode 5 of the sketch show Astronomy Club: The Sketch Show, there is a sketch about an ASMR award show.

In season 7, episode 8 ("The Takeback") of the sitcom Brooklyn Nine-Nine, Jake Peralta pretends to be an excessively soft-spoken and famous ASMRtist, helping pull off a reverse heist to put back stolen gems.

In season 9, episode 3 ("Boxed In") of the show Beavis and Butt-Head, Beavis and Butt-head sit on their couch and watch a Youtube video featuring "Gibi ASMR".

Fictional and creative literature
In March 2013, the American weekly hour-long radio program This American Life, broadcast the first short story on the subject of ASMR, called "A Tribe Called Rest", authored and read by American novelist and screenwriter Andrea Seigel.

In 2001, in her novel A Brief Stay with the Living, Marie Darrieussecq describes the sensation in several pages; see for example pp. 21–22, describing a visit to an ophthalmologist:

Non-fiction
The Idiot's Guide series has one book on ASMR written by Julie Young and Ilse Blansert (aka ASMRtist TheWaterwhispers), published in 2015.

In 2018, Craig Richard, founder of ASMRUniversity.com, published his book Brain Tingles.

Exhibitions
In 2020, the first major exhibition on ASMR – Weird Sensation Feels Good – took place at ArkDes, Sweden's national museum for architecture and design. In 2022, an expanded iteration of the exhibition opened at the Design Museum in London.

See also
 :Category:Practitioners of autonomous sensory meridian response
 Flow
 Mukbang 
 Music and sleep

References

External links

 

Articles containing video clips
Autonomous sensory meridian response
Internet art
Internet culture
Perception
Phenomena
Sensory systems